Robert Higgins may refer to:

 Robert J. Higgins (born 1934), judge and politician in New Brunswick
 Robert P. Higgins (born 1932), systematic invertebrate zoologist and ecologist
 Robert 'Iain' Higgins (born 1976), rugby league footballer

 Robert Higgins (baseball), American baseball player

 Robert Higgins (weightlifter) (1925–1998), American weightlifter
 Robert Samuel Decosta Higgins, American surgeon

See also
 Bob Higgins (disambiguation)